Behrouz Ataei (born August 5, 1970 in Amol, Mazandaran Province) is an Iranian former professional volleyball player and current manager. He is currently head coach of Iran men's national volleyball team. He started playing volleyball in 1985, and two years later, for eight consecutive years, he was a member of the national teams of different categories of youth and adults.

Ataei began coaching in 2007 and in 2008 he won the first division league of the country with Kalleh Mazandaran team and brought this team to the Super League. Ataei has been the head coach of the Kalleh team for eleven years. He also led Matin Varamin's volleyball team in 2015 for a year. He became the head coach of the Iranian national youth team in 2017, and this contract was extended in 2019. Ataei inspired Iran to win the 2019 FIVB U21 World Championship for the first time. He returned to the Kalleh team in 2018 and remained the team's head coach until 2020.

Sporting achievements

As coach

National

Club (International Tournaments)

Club (Iranian Super League)

References

External links 

 Behrouz Ataei Instagram page
 Behrouz Ataei Facebook profile
Behrouz Ataei profile on WorldofVolley database

1970 births
Living people
People from Amol
Iranian men's volleyball players
Iranian volleyball coaches
Sportspeople from Mazandaran province